Leucocortinarius is a genus of fungus in the family Tricholomataceae. It is a monotypic genus, containing the single species Leucocortinarius bulbiger, found in Europe.

See also

 List of Tricholomataceae genera

References

Fungi of Europe
Tricholomataceae
Monotypic Agaricales genera
Taxa described in 1945